"Right on Track" is a 1987 hit single by the American band Breakfast Club. Written by the band's lead singer and drummer, Dan Gilroy and Stephen Bray respectively, the single climbed to number 7 on the US Billboard Hot 100 chart on May 30, 1987. The single also peaked at number 54 on the UK Singles Chart and number 7 on the Billboard Dance Club Songs chart that same year.

Charts

Weekly charts

Year-end charts

References

1986 songs
Songs written by Stephen Bray
Song recordings produced by Jimmy Iovine
MCA Records singles
1987 singles